The Bainuk people (also called Banyuk, Banun, Banyun, Bainouk, Bainunk, Banyum, Bagnoun, Banhum, Banyung, Ñuñ, Elomay, or Elunay) are an ethnic group that today lives primarily in Senegal as well as in parts of Gambia and Guinea-Bissau.

History 
The Bainuk are believed to have been the first inhabitants of the lower Casamance.The name Banyun is attributed to the Portuguese, who derived the word from Mandinka and applied it as a collective name for a number of groups settled at strategic sites along waterways, portages, and trade paths between the Gambia and Cacheu rivers.... Possibly Banyun served as a generic term for "trader," much as dyula identifies Mande traders engaged in long-distance commerce (Map 9).

In the fifteenth century, there were at least five Bainuk states including Bichangor, Jase, Foni, and Buguando. The Bainuk were also a major component of the population of the Kasa kingdom.

In modern times the Bainuk have heavily adopted Mande and Jola cultural customs.

Culture 
Many Bainuk are adherents of Islam, a process that began around the 17th century due to the influence of Muslim Mande scholars and merchants settling in the region. Some also practice their traditional animistic religion.

The Bainuk are known as skilled dyers and weavers.

Notes

Sources
Clark, Andrew F. and Lucie Colvin Phillips, Historical Dictionary of Senegal (Metuchen, New Jersey: Scarecrow Press, 1994) p. 73, 179.
Barry, Boubacar. Senegambia and the Atlantic Salve Trade (Cambridge: University Press, 1998), p. 21

External links 
 ELAR archive of Bainouk and its main contact language Mandinka

Ethnic groups in Senegal
Ethnic groups in the Gambia
Ethnic groups in Guinea-Bissau